Daniel Pope is a former professional American football player who played punter for three seasons for the Kansas City Chiefs, Cincinnati Bengals, New York Jets, and New England Patriots.  He attended Milton High School.

References

1975 births
American football punters
Detroit Lions players
Kansas City Chiefs players
New York Jets players
Cincinnati Bengals players
Alabama Crimson Tide football players
Living people